Mohamad Ali Jinnah is a Bangladesh Nationalist Party politician and the former Member of Parliament of Chittagong-1.

Career
Jinnah was elected to parliament from Chittagong-1 as a Bangladesh Nationalist Party candidate in 1996 and 2001. He joined Liberal Democratic Party in 2006.

References

Bangladesh Nationalist Party politicians
Living people
5th Jatiya Sangsad members
8th Jatiya Sangsad members
People from Chittagong District
Year of birth missing (living people)